CCAA may stand for:
 California Collegiate Athletic Association, an intercollegiate athletic conference in the Division II of the NCAA
 Cameroon Civil Aviation Authority, the civil aviation authority of Cameroon
 Canadian Collegiate Athletic Association, the national governing body for organized sports at colleges in Canada

 Colonia Claudia Ara Agrippinensium, the name of the Roman colony in the Rhineland out of which the German city of Cologne developed
 Companies' Creditors Arrangement Act, a statute of the Parliament of Canada that allows insolvent corporations to restructure their business and financial affairs
 Croatian Civil Aviation Agency, agency of Croatia